Peter Lawrence Staples (born 3 May 1944) is an English musician best known as the original bassist of The Troggs.

The Troggs
A founding member of the band, Staples and guitarist Chris Britton left their first group together, Ten Feet Five, in 1964 to form The Troggs with lead vocalist Reg Presley and drummer Ronnie Bond. They went on to have nine UK singles chart entries between mid-1966 and early 1968. Staples married in 1968, and left the group the following year.

Post-Troggs career 
After The Troggs, Staples became a pub landlord and then an electrician. He eventually started a band called the Wild Things and is still writing songs and performing live. His latest song published in May 2012 can be heard on his website. He contributed to the Troggs segment of the 1995 Channel 4 documentary My Generation. In 2015, Staples reunited with Chris Britton to perform 'Wild Thing' with its composer Chip Taylor.

Discography

External links 
petestaples.co.uk Pete Staples

References

1944 births
Living people
The Troggs members